Carson–Young House is a historic home located near Marion, McDowell County, North Carolina.  It was built about 1860, and is two-story, three bay, frame I-house with Greek Revival style design influences. A one-story, hip-roofed rear addition was built about 1951.  It features a central, one-bay-wide, two-story porch is capped with a full pediment roof.  Also on the property is a contributing two-story, brick schoolhouse (c. 1860) and barn.

It was listed on the National Register of Historic Places in 2011.

References

Houses on the National Register of Historic Places in North Carolina
Greek Revival houses in North Carolina
Houses completed in 1860
Houses in McDowell County, North Carolina
National Register of Historic Places in McDowell County, North Carolina